Florian Rieder (born 16 May 1996) is an Austrian professional footballer who plays as a midfielder for Austria Klagenfurt.

External links
 
 

Austrian footballers
1996 births
Living people
FC Wacker Innsbruck (2002) players
WSG Tirol players
SK Austria Klagenfurt players
Austrian Football Bundesliga players
2. Liga (Austria) players
Austrian Regionalliga players
Association football midfielders